Irbis-E (Snow Leopard) is a Russian multi-mode, hybrid passive electronically scanned array radar system developed by Tikhomirov NIIP for the Sukhoi Su-35 multi-purpose fighter aircraft. NIIP developed the Irbis-E radar from the N011M Bars radar system used on Sukhoi Su-30MKI aircraft.

Design
Irbis-E development started in 2004 and the first radar prototype entered flight tests on board an Su-30M2 aircraft acting as a test bed in early 2007. The resulting radar system provides air-to-air, air-to-sea and air-to-ground (ground mapping, Doppler beam sharpening and Synthetic Aperture Radar modes) modes with improved performance in intense clutter (radar) environments compared to its predecessor, the Bars system. In addition, Irbis has been designed to detect low and super-low observable/stealth airborne threats.

This is an multifunctional X band multi-role radar with a passive phased antenna array (PAA) mounted on a two-step hydraulic drive unit (60° in azimuth and elevation). The antenna device scans by an electronically controlled beam in azimuth and angle of elevation in sectors not smaller than 60°. The two-step electro-hydraulic drive unit additionally turns the antenna by mechanic means to 60° in azimuth and 120° in elevation. Thus, in using the electronic control and mechanical additional turn of the antenna, the maximum deflection angle of the beam grows to 120°. The radar employs 900mm passive phased array antenna mounted on a hydraulic actuator.  

The Irbis-E is a direct evolution of the BARS design, but significantly more powerful. While the hybrid phased array antenna is retained, the noise figure is slightly worse at 3.5 dB, but the receiver has four rather than three discrete channels. The biggest change is in the EGSP-27 transmitter, where the single 7-kilowatt peak power rated Chelnok TWT is replaced with a pair of 10-kilowatt peak power rated Chelnok tubes, ganged to provide a total peak power rating of 20 kilowatts. The radar is cited at an average power rating of 5 kilowatts, with 2 kilowatts CW rating for illumination. NIIP claim twice the bandwidth and improved frequency agility over the BARS, and better ECCM capability. The Irbis-E has new Solo-35.01 digital signal processor hardware and Solo-35.02 data processor, but retains receiver hardware, the master oscillator and exciter of the BARS. A prototype has been in flight test since late 2005.

Operational features
According NIIP's product specification, the Irbis-E can detect and track up to 30 airborne targets at one time at ranges near 350 kilometers, and attack up to 8. In air-to-surface mode the Irbis-E provides mapping allowing to attack four surface targets with precision-guided weapons while scanning the horizon searching for airborne threats that can be engaged using semi-active radar homing missiles. In air-to-surface mode, the radar has a limited SAR resolution. 

It can detect a target with radar cross-section (RCS) 3m2 at up to 350 km within ± 120 degrees while the radar can get a quality track and engage four targets within 100 km range. In track-while-scan mode, the radar can engage two targets with semi-active radar homing missiles. It can detect and track up to 30 airborne targets with a Radar Cross Section (RCS) of three square meters at ranges of 400 kilometers using track-while-scan mode while engaging two targets with semi-active radar homing missiles or up to eight targets with active radar homing missiles. In the air-to-surface mode the Irbis provides clues allowing to attack two surface targets with precision-guided weapons while tracking up to four targets on the ground and scanning the horizon searching for airborne threats that can be engaged using active radar homing missiles.

Application 
In 2007, the first radar prototype entered flight tests on board an Su-30MK2 aircraft. Tikhomirov NIIP Irbis-E radar is operational with the Su-35 multi-purpose fighter aircraft, Su-27SM2/SM3 and Su-30MK2.

References

See also

Aircraft radars
Russian and Soviet military radars
Tikhomirov Scientific Research Institute of Instrument Design products
Military equipment introduced in the 2000s